Ticket to Ride is a turn-based strategy video game, based upon Alan R. Moon's German-style board game of the same name, developed by Next Level Games and published by Playful Entertainment, Inc. The game started out as a browser game on November 15, 2004. In February 2017 Days of Wonder abandoned Linux support, although Xbox still seems to support the game having crossed it over to the Xbox One & Xbox X.

Gameplay 

Gameplay is identical to the board game: there are two types of cards, colored train cars representing a type of cargo (e.g., black represents coal cars), and destination cards which feature two city destinations (e.g., Chicago to Miami). Each player is dealt three destination cards, and must choose at least two of them. They are also dealt six train cards.

Players may draw train cards, a new destination card, or claim a colored route on their turn. To claim a route, a player must pay with a combination of same-colored cards including locomotives which serve as wild cards. Once a route is claimed, no other player may claim it; some routes feature double routes which allow up to two players to claim it, but only if four or five players are playing. In two or three-player games, the double routes can only be claimed by one person. The players immediately earn points for each successful route they claim. At the end of the game, players earn the points listed on the destination card. If a player decides to pick a new destination card, he draws three cards and may choose any of the cards; however, the player must pick at least one destination.

The game ends when at least one of the players has expended their trains. Players are given bonuses for completed destinations, and penalized for unrealized destinations. The player with the longest contiguous route earns an additional bonus.

Multiplayer
Ticket to Ride supports play with up to five people on Xbox Live or four people on the same console, and supports the Xbox Live Vision cam.

It also supports Steam, and did so for Linux until February 2017.

Downloadable content
The Europe map was released for download on August 1, 2008, for Xbox Live Arcade and on May 24, 2012, on PC and Mac. The Europe map includes two new types of route in addition to a new map: 'Ferry' routes, which require 'Locomotive' cards to be played when claiming them, and 'Tunnel' routes, which add an element of risk and chance to the game.

The 1910 USA map was released on September 17, 2008, on Xbox Live Arcade and on May 24, 2012, for PC and Mac. It added 35 new destination tickets, the Globetrotter bonus card (for completing the most routes), and a large map.

The Legendary Asia map from the Map Collection 1 expansion was released on August 2, 2012, for PC and Mac.

The Switzerland map was released on May 24, 2012, for PC and Mac.

Reception

The iOS version received "universal acclaim", while the Xbox 360 version received "average" reviews, according to the review aggregation website Metacritic.

Reviews
Pyramid - PC version

See also
Catan
Carcassonne (video game)
Lost Cities (video game)

References

External links
 

2004 video games
Browser games
Video games based on board games
Video games developed in Canada
Xbox 360 Live Arcade games
Xbox 360 games
Indie video games
Steam Greenlight games
Windows games
MacOS games
Linux games
Android (operating system) games
Play-by-email video games
Next Level Games games
Multiplayer and single-player video games